Shambhunath Singh (17 June 1916 – 3 September 1991) was a Hindi writer, freedom fighter, poet and social worker. He was born in Rawatpar village, Deoria district, Uttar Pradesh, India. He did his M.A. in Hindi, earned a Doctoral degree, and worked as a teacher at Mahatma Gandhi Kashi Vidyapith, and finally retired as Professor and Head of the Hindi Department, Sampurnanand Sanskrit Vishwavidyalaya, Varanasi.

Shambhunath Singh was a lyric poet, though he has written a few plays and literary criticism also.

He has written a book-length reevaluation of the book 'Chhayavada'.

He started the Navageet movement with publishing his collection of poems Divalok. In this book, despair frustration and desire for beauty are the major themes.

Later he shifted to the holy city of Varanasi with his late wife Prabhavati Singh.
 
He has special place in the history of Hindi poetry. His poems show new intellectual consciousness. Portrayal of the modern inconsistency in the human life is the unique features of his writings.

A Non-Governmental Organization working for the deprived and marginalized peoples of the community is named after him. The name of the organization is Dr. Shambhunath Singh Research Foundation (SRF).

Selected works
Samay ki shila par 
Jaha dard neela hai 
Harijan geet (on Dalits)
Divalok
Rup rashmi (1946)
Chāyāloka (1970)
Udayācala (1970)
Navgeet Dashak (1982)
Hindī ālocanā ke jyoti-stambha (1972)

References 

1916 births
1991 deaths
Hindi-language poets
Hindi-language writers
Indian independence activists from Uttar Pradesh
Social workers
Social workers from Uttar Pradesh